The Brigham–Kanner Property Rights Conference was organized in 2003 at the Marshall-Wythe School of Law at the College of William & Mary, with the first conference held in October 2004. The Conference and Prize were proposed in 2003 by Joseph T. Waldo, a graduate of the Marshall-Wythe School of Law with the support of the then dean of the law school, W. Taylor Reveley III who would later become president of the college.

The Conference and Prize were inaugurated in 2004. Each Fall the Brigham–Kanner Property Rights Conference awards the Brigham-Kanner Property Rights Prize to an individual whose work has advanced the cause of property rights and has contributed to the overall awareness of the important role property rights occupy in the broader scheme of individual liberty. The Conference seeks to bring together at the college legal practitioners in the field of property law from across the nation along with judges and legal scholars to discuss developments in property rights.

The Conference Committee is composed of three members.  The Committee and Conference are supported by an advisory board for the Conference and an advisory board for the Journal.

Journal
Beginning in 2011, the Conference began publishing the Brigham–Kanner Property Rights Journal (formerly Brigham–Kanner Property Rights Conference Journal) as a chronicle of the Conference's panels.  Volume 1, whose focus was "Comparative Property Rights," features 17 articles that explore the similarities and differences of the property systems in the U.S., China, and other countries. The articles were written by leading scholars and practitioners from the U.S. and China. Articles provide a comparative analysis of legal protection of property rights and also explore topics such as the role of property in promoting social and economic policy, the impact of culture on property systems, and the relationship between property rights and the environment. Four articles reflect on Justice Sandra Day O'Connor's property rights decisions, in recognition of her receipt of the 2011 Brigham-Kanner Property Rights Prize. Subsequent Volumes have had such topics as "Interdisciplinary Perspectives on Property," "The Essence of Property," "Defining the Reach of Property," "Property as a Form of Government," and "The Role of Property in Secure Societies."

Conferences
In 2011 the Conference, which most years is hosted at William & Mary's Marshall-Wythe School of Law, was hosted by Tsinghua University in Beijing, China. During the 2011 Conference, which was the Eighth Annual Brigham Kanner Property Rights Conference, Retired United States Supreme Court Justice Sandra Day O'Connor received the Brigham Kanner Prize. The reception was held in the U.S. Embassy in Beijing. The 2011 Conference featured lectures and panel discussions by the leading property rights scholars and practitioners from China and the United States.

The Thirteenth Annual Conference, held in 2016, was hosted by the Peace Palace in The Hague, Netherlands and was presented in cooperation with the Grotius Centre for International Legal Studies of Leiden Law School. The recipient of the year's Brigham-Kanner Property Rights Prize was Hernando de Soto, Prize-winning economist and author of The Mystery of Capital and The Other Path.

The Nineteenth Annual Conference was held September 29–30, 2022, and honored James S. Burling, Vice President of Legal Affairs at the Pacific Legal Foundation, attorney for the Pacific Legal Foundation defending landowners' interests, including before the Supreme Court of the United States in Palazzolo v. Rhode Island, and author of numerous works promoting the civil liberty of private property ownership.

Recipients of the Brigham-Kanner Prize
 2004 – Frank Michelman, Harvard Law School
 2005 – Richard Epstein, University of Chicago Law School
 2006 – James W. Ely, Jr., Vanderbilt University Law School
 2007 – Margaret Radin, University of Michigan Law School
 2008 – Robert Ellickson, Yale Law School
 2009 – Richard Pipes, Harvard University
 2010 – Carol M. Rose, University of Arizona James E. Rogers College of Law
 2011 – Sandra Day O'Connor, Associate Justice of the Supreme Court of the United States (retired)
 2012 – James E. Krier, University of Michigan Law School
 2013 – Thomas W. Merrill, Columbia Law School
 2014 – Michael M. Berger, Manatt, Phelps & Phillips
 2015 – Joseph W. Singer, Harvard Law School
 2016 – Hernando de Soto Polar, Institute for Liberty and Democracy
 2017 - David L. Callies, University of Hawai'i at Manoa William S. Richardson School of Law
 2018 - Stewart E. Sterk, Benjamin N. Cardozo School of Law
 2019 - Steven J. Eagle, Antonin Scalia School of Law
 2020 - Henry E. Smith, Harvard Law School 
 2021 - Vicki Been, New York University School of Law
 2022 - James S. Burling, Pacific Legal Foundation

References

External links
 http://www.bkconference.com
 https://law.wm.edu/academics/intellectuallife/conferencesandlectures/propertyrights/index.php

College of William & Mary
Recurring events established in 2004
2004 establishments in Virginia